Vexillum bancalanense is a species of sea snail, a marine gastropod mollusk, in the family Costellariidae, the ribbed miters.

Description
The length of the shell attains 10.6 mm; its diameter 4 mm.

(Original description) The small shell is elongate ovate. The spire is flesh colored except the narrow dark zone on the suture. In the body whorl the posterior half of the whorl is encircled by a light brown band, the rest of the shell being flesh colored. The protoconch consists of 1½ whorls, strongly rounded, smooth, forming a somewhat mamillated apex. The whorls of the teleoconch are roundly shouldered at the summit, well rounded, marked by strong, broad, slightly protractive axial ribs, of which sixteen occur upon the first to fifth, fourteen upon the sixth, and twelve upon the penultimate whorl. These ribs become slightly enfeebled at the summit, and evanesce on reaching the anterior half of the base. In addition to the axial ribs the entire surface of the shell is marked by very fine lines of growth. The spaces between the ribs are a little wider than the ribs and are crossed by three incised pits between the summit and the suture, the space between the summit and the first being the widest, while that between the first and second equals the space between the suture and the third in width, the space between the second and third being a little wider than the last named. The suture is strongly marked. The base of the shell is rather prolonged, slightly concave at the insertion of the columella, the posterior third marked by six incised spiral lines, which are less regularly
spaced than those on the spire. The anterior two-thirds of the base is marked by eight irregular, broad, low, rounded spiral cords. The aperture is irregularly elongate oval, posterior angle acute, decidedly channeled 
anteriorly. The outer lip is thin, somewhat sinuous. The inner lip is provided with four oblique folds of which the posterior is the strongest, the others becoming successively weaker. The parietal wall is covered by a thin callus anteriorly,and a much thicker one at the posterior angle of the aperture.

Distribution
This marine species occurs off the Philippines.

References

External links
 

bancalanense
Gastropods described in 1918